The Executive Council of the Western Cape is the cabinet of the executive branch of the provincial government in the South African province of the Western Cape. The Members of the Executive Council (MECs) are appointed from among the members of the Western Cape Provincial Legislature by the Premier of the Western Cape, an office held since the 2019 general election by Alan Winde. The council is referred to as the Executive Council in the national Constitution, but is denoted the Provincial Cabinet of the Western Cape in the Western Cape Constitution.

Rasool premiership: 2004–2008 
Following his election as Premier in the 2004 general election, Ebrahim Rasool announced his new Provincial Cabinet on 30 April 2004. On 26 July 2005, he announced a reshuffle affecting three portfolios, in which two new Provincial Ministers were appointed – one incumbent, Chris Stali, was fired, and another, Mcebisi Skwatsha, had resigned to take up the full-time position of Provincial Secretary of the African National Congress (ANC).

Brown premiership: 2008–2009 
Lynne Brown was sworn in as Premier in July 2008 after the incumbent, Ebrahim Rasool, resigned at the request of the ANC, his political party. Later the same week, she announced a wide-ranging cabinet reshuffle in which four new provincial ministers were appointed and most others changed portfolios, leaving only one minister, Cobus Dowry, in his initial position. Brown fired two ministers who had been viewed as aligned to Rasool – Leonard Ramatlakane and Richard Dyantyi – and one of Rasool's other ministers, Tasneem Essop, had resigned in the aftermath of Rasool's own departure.

Zille premiership

First term: 2009–2014 
In May 2009, following her election in the 2009 general election, Premier Helen Zille announced her new Provincial Cabinet. In early September 2010, she announced her first reshuffle: only three portfolios were affected, but two ministers – Lennit Max and Sakkie Jenner – were fired from the cabinet. In the 2011 local government elections, Social Development Minister Patricia de Lille was elected Mayor of Cape Town; in a minor reshuffle on 29 May, Zille announced that de Lille would be replaced by Albert Fritz, who in turn would be replaced in the Community Safety portfolio by Dan Plato.

Second term: 2014–2019 
After her re-election in the 2014 general election, Zille announced her new Provincial Cabinet, to be sworn in on 26 May 2014; she appointed two new MECs, Nomafrench Mbombo and Debbie Schäfer, who had not served in the cabinet during her first term. On 31 December 2014, Zille announced that Mbombo, who until then served as Provincial Minister of Cultural Affairs and Sport, would swap portfolios with Health Minister Theuns Botha, effective from 1 January 2015. Botha resigned from the Executive Council in April 2015 and was replaced by Anroux Marais. Finally, on 19 October 2018, Zille announced that Alan Winde would become Provincial Minister of Community Safety, replacing Dan Plato, who in turn would succeed former Minister Patricia de Lille as Mayor of Cape Town; Beverley Schäfer was appointed to the cabinet to replace Winde in the renamed Economic Opportunities portfolio.

Winde premiership: 2019–present 
On 23 May 2019, following his election in the 2019 general election, Premier Alan Winde announced his new cabinet. On 24 May 2021, he appointed Daylin Mitchell as Provincial Minister for Transport and Public Works after the former incumbent, Bonginkosi Madikizela, resigned amid a qualifications fraud scandal. In early 2022, two vacancies arose in the cabinet after Albert Fritz was fired from the Community Safety portfolio and Debbie Schäfer resigned from the Education portfolio. On 22 April that year, Winde announced a reshuffle that would fill the vacancies and create two newly reconfigured portfolios, Mobility and Infrastructure. In February 2023, Winde appointed Ricardo Mackenzie as the Minister of Mobility after Daylin Mitchell was elected speaker of the Western Cape Provincial Parliament.

References 

Government of the Western Cape